
 
UNIDO Goodwill Ambassador is an official postnominal honorific title, title of authority, legal status and job description assigned to those goodwill ambassadors and advocates who are designated by the United Nations. UNIDO goodwill ambassadors are expert advocates of the United Nations Industrial Development Organization (UNIDO) and use their abilities and experience to advocate for sustainable industrial development in developing countries. Other United Nations goodwill ambassador programs usually take a celebrity approach.

Current UNIDO goodwill ambassadors

Current listed and supporting goodwill ambassadors, and the year they were appointed:

See also 
 Goodwill Ambassador
 FAO Goodwill Ambassador
 UNDP Goodwill Ambassador
 UNHCR Goodwill Ambassador
 UNESCO Goodwill Ambassador
 UNODC Goodwill Ambassador
 UNFPA Goodwill Ambassador
 UN Women Goodwill Ambassador
 UNICEF Goodwill Ambassador
 WFP Goodwill Ambassador
 WHO Goodwill Ambassador

References

External links 
UNIDO Goodwill Ambassadors

United Nations Industrial Development Organization
Goodwill ambassador programmes
United Nations goodwill ambassadors